Tezozomoctli Acolnahuacatl was an Aztec-Nahua noble son of the Nahua tlatoani Axayacatl of the Tlatoque of Ecatepec.

He was a brother of Aztec tlatoani Moctezuma II of Tenochtitlan. 

He was the father of Diego de Alvarado Huanitzin, and grandfather of Fernando Alvarado Tezozomoc of the Viceroyalty of New Spain (colonial México).

See also

References

Bibliography 

Moctezuma family
15th-century indigenous people of the Americas
15th century in the Aztec civilization
Tlatoque of Ecatepec
Nobility of the Americas
Mexican nobility
Aztec nobility
15th-century nobility
15th-century Mexican nobility